The Apocalypse Is Over is the third studio album by the folk-singer John Craigie. It was released in August 2013 on Zabriskie Point Records. The album was inspired by Craigie's regular trips to New Orleans, where he was captivated by the music and spirit he found there. Blending jazz, folk, blues and country, the songs transport listeners from life in the French Quarter ("Preservation Hall") to Van Gogh’s descent into madness in the south of France ("Rachel") and to the lonely life of a musician on the road ("We Ain’t Leavin’ this Bar Patrick (Till We Find You Some Love)").

As with Montana Tale and October is the Kindest Month, Randy Schwartz appears on drums and Cian Riordan is chief engineer. Steve Adams also returns on bass and as co-producer with Craigie and Schwartz.

Track listing

Personnel 
John Craigie – acoustic guitar, banjolele, harmonica, vocals, percussion, producer
Steve Adams - bass, percussion, vocals, producer 
Randy Schwartz - drums, percussion, vocals, producer
Clinton Curtis - piano, guitar, washboard, percussion, vocals
Sean Hayes - vocals
Holly McGarry - vocals
Leigh Jones - vocals
Nicholas Gyorkos - trombone, bass trombone
Matt Chiasson - clarinet, alto saxophone, tenor saxophone
Scott Makson - trumpet
Zach Wookey - trumpet
Mike Brun - trumpet
Matt Berkeley - organ
Gianni Staiano - accordion
Kat Fountain - harmonica
Anna Tivel - violin, mandolin
Ezra Lipp - percussion

Production:
Cian Riordan - engineering, mixing

References

John Craigie (musician) albums
2013 albums